San Isidro is a municipality in the Morazán department of El Salvador.

Municipalities of the Morazán Department